Lego Ideas (formerly known as Lego Cuusoo) is a website run by Chaordix and The Lego Group, which allows users to submit ideas for Lego products to be turned into potential sets available commercially, with the original designer receiving 1% of the royalties. It started in 2008 as an offshoot of the Japanese company Cuusoo, named after the Japanese word 空想 kūsō (daydream, fantasy).

Background
Lego Ideas was first introduced as an offshoot of the Japanese company Cuusoo, produced as a collaboration between that company and The Lego Group. Titled Lego Cuusoo, the site was labeled a beta site and remained so until the unveiling of Lego Ideas as a finished product. In 2014, the platform moved to Chaordix.

Process

User submission phase
Users express their idea by combining a written description of the idea and a sample Lego model that demonstrates the concept into a project page. Once the page is published it is viewable to other users. The goal of every project is to be supported by 10,000 different users, which would then make the project eligible for review. At first, projects would be kept on the Cuusoo/Ideas website for up to two years and then taken down if the project did not reach the 10,000 required votes of support. Lego Ideas later changed the threshold to include a minimum number of 100 votes in the first 60 days after submission or the project would expire, followed by a year to reach 1,000 votes, another six months to reach 5,000 votes and finally six months to reach the 10,000 supported votes.

Originally, project submissions were allowed to be about anything and had no limits on the size and style of project. After sets began to be rejected with stated reasons, Lego Ideas announced restrictions on content including the use of no new part molds, banning intellectual properties owned by competing toy companies, and adult content. Lego Ideas further restricted project submissions in June 2016 by limiting the size of the project to a maximum of 3,000 pieces, any project replicating a life-size weapon, and any project based on an intellectual property already produced as a set by Lego Ideas/Cuusoo. Ideas further restricted submissions in 2017 by disallowing any projects based on third-party licenses already being produced by Lego, such as Star Wars and Harry Potter.

All eligible projects are collectively reviewed in the order of whichever projects hit 10,000 supporters within any of the three tri-annual deadlines of May, September, or January.

Review phase
Due to the increasing number of project submissions based on ideas that The Lego Group would reject, Lego Ideas has refined its submission standards over the years.

Since its inception, a number of sets that have reached the 10,000 vote threshold have been rejected during the review for various reasons. Some rejected sets have been based on specific intellectual properties were rejected due to the content matter presented. Any theme that relates to alcohol, sex, drugs, religious references, post-World War II warfare or based on a first-person shooter is deemed inappropriate for younger Lego fans. IPs that have been rejected for this reason have been based on Firefly and Shaun of the Dead.

Other projects which have been rejected include ones based on My Little Pony: Friendship Is Magic due to the property being owned by rival toy manufacturer Hasbro, certain sets based on The Legend of Zelda due to the need to create too many original molds, although Lego did not completely rule out other projects based on the franchise, and a Sandcrawler set for the Ultimate Collector Series due to The Lego Group's ongoing collaboration with Lucasfilm on Lego Star Wars.

In the first 2015 review, announced in October 2015, no projects were selected for the first time as the many projects were rejected for various reasons. Many of these projects would not have met the revised submission standards issued in June 2016.

A record 26 projects qualified for the first 2020 review followed by another record 35 qualified projects in the second 2020 review. Lego cited the sudden increase in projects surpassing the 10,000 vote threshold was likely due to the global lockdown amidst the COVID-19 pandemic. The first 2021 review phase saw yet another record number with 57 qualified projects after one project was disqualified due to an intellectual property conflict.

Production phase
If the product is cleared for production, it is further developed by Lego set designers and the final model gets released as an official set under the "Lego Ideas" banner. Users that have their projects produced receive ten copies of the final set, as well as a 1% royalty of the product's net sales and credit and bio in set materials as the Lego Ideas set creator.

Sets
As of July 1, 2022 50 sets have been produced and 69 sets have been announced (including GWP sets):

 Set based on an original idea
 Set based on an existing intellectual property
Sets are listed in order of announcement. Bold line indicates when branding changed from Cuusoo to Ideas. Flags represent the creators country of origin.

Promotional sets
LEGO Ideas offers contests to fan designers on the crowdsourcing platform.

Prizes include LEGO sets or, in some cases, the possibility of transforming the first prize into an official LEGO set in the form of a GWP (Gift With Purchase).

Currently, 6 competitions have been awarded with such a prize.

 Set based on an original idea
 Set based on an existing intellectual property

Test Lab Challenge 
In September 2022, LEGO Ideas opened an invite-only challenge to fan designers on the crowdsourcing platform for digitally designed sets with a limited palette.

In January 2023, 9 designs were selected with them set to be released for purchase on Lego.com throughout 2023.

 Set based on an original idea
 Set based on an existing intellectual property

Awards and nominations
In September 2022, The Office (set number: 21336) was awarded "Toy of the Year" and also "Grown-Up Toy of the Year" by the Toy Association.

References

External links
 Official website
 Lego Ideas Wiki, an unofficial encyclopedia about Lego Ideas

Ideas